RAF India, later called Air Forces in India (1938–47) was a command of the Royal Air Force (RAF) that was active from 1918 until Indian independence and partition in 1947. It was the air force counterpart of the British Army in India.

Origins and history 
The command had its origins in units of the Royal Flying Corps in India. In November 1915, the War Office despatched No. 31 Squadron to India, the squadron arriving at Nowshera in December. The squadron, including a basic aircraft park, was subsequently transferred to Risalpur. A period of intensive training ensued, during which flights were periodically sent on patrols over the North-West Frontier regions. A second squadron (No. 114 Squadron) was added in 1917. When the RAF was formed in May 1918, the total strength of the air force in India was 80 officers and 600 men. During the 1920s and 1930s, RAF India suffered from under-funding and subordination to the Commander-in-Chief, India; in July 1938, Thomas Inskip, the Minister for Co-ordination of Defence, released a report highlighting the command's "deplorable obsolescence which rendered it un-employable against modern aircraft." At the time, RAF India only received from 4 to 7 percent of the defence budget for British India, less than the allocation for the 16 horsed cavalry regiments in the British Indian Army.

Second World War 
The air component of the British-American South East Asia Command became Air Command, South East Asia (ACSEA) on 30 December 1943, under Air Chief Marshal Sir Richard Peirse, who had been appointed Air Officer Commanding-in-Chief, Air Forces in India, in March 1942. It was based almost entirely in India and drew its administrative support from the RAF's Air Forces India.

On 1 July 1944 ACSEA comprised No. 222 Group RAF, No. 225 Group RAF, No. 229 Group RAF, and Eastern Air Command, under U.S. Lieutenant General George E. Stratemeyer, itself being made up of the Strategic Air Force (7th Bombardment Group USAAF and No. 231 Group RAF, under Brigadier General Howard C. Davidson of the United States Army Air Force); the U.S. Tenth Air Force (80th Fighter Group, 311th Fighter Group, and 443rd Troop Carrier Group); the RAF Third Tactical Air Force (Nos 221 and 224 Groups, No. 177 Wing RAF, 3d Combat Cargo Group USAAF, and 12th Bombardment Group USAAF); the Photographic Reconnaissance Force (No. 171 Wing RAF and U.S. 8th Photographic Reconnaissance Group); and No. 293 Wing RAF. By January 1945 ACSEA's subsidiary Base Air Forces South East Asia, under Air Marshal Sir Roderick Carr, comprised No. 223 Group RAF on the North West Frontier at RAF Peshawar, No. 225 Group RAF (responsible for the "air defence of southern India and the whole coastline from Bengal to Karachi," by January 1943 controlling Nos 172 and 173 Wings), No. 226 Group RAF, No. 227 Group RAF, and No. 230 Group RAF, carrying out maintenance, training, and administration.

Thomas and Carr from March 1944 were Air Officers Commanding, Air Headquarters India. When Hugh Walmsley arrived at the headquarters he was initially appointed as Air Officer Administration. But by the time Walmsley was appointed as AOC, the command's title had become RAF India once more.

Postwar

Strikes in January 1946 

A series of demonstrations and strikes occurred at several dozen Royal Air Force stations in the Indian subcontinent beginning on 22 January 1946. As these incidents involved refusals to obey orders, they technically constituted a form of mutiny. The protests arose in response to slow demobilization and return of British troops to Britain, and use of British shipping facilities for transporting G.I.s. The "mutiny" began at either Maripur or nearby Karachi (RAF Drigh Road) and later spread to involve nearly 50,000 men over 60 RAF stations in India, Burma, Ceylon and as far away as Singapore, Egypt, North Africa, and Gibraltar. The peaceful protests lasted between three and eleven days. 

For their part, the British Government argued that there was insufficient shipping available to immediately repatriate British personnel. However, later declassified reports have shown that British troops were deliberately retained in India to control possible unrest from the Indian independence movement.

Some of the airmen involved faced courts-martial. However, the precedent set by this event was important in instigating subsequent actions by the Royal Indian Air Force and later, the Royal Indian Navy in February 1946, in which mutinies on 78 ships broke out. Lord Wavell, Viceroy of India, commented at the time, "I am afraid that [the] example of the Royal Air Force, who got away with what was really a mutiny, has some responsibility for the present situation."

Drawdown and disbandment 
The four major RAF formations under HQ Air Command South East Asia in India and Ceylon at the end of the war were HQ Base Air Forces South East Asia (BAFSEA); Air Headquarters Burma; HQ 222 Group at Columbo, controlling all operational squadrons in Ceylon, largely carrying out maritime duties; and 229 Group, a Transport Command group located in New Delhi. 222 Group disbanded by being renamed AHQ Ceylon on 15 October 1945; it inherited six Liberator squadrons (Nos 99, 356, 203, 8, 160, and 321 RNLAF); four Sunderland squadrons (205, 209, 230, and 240); and No. 136 Squadron with Spitfires.

No. 223 Group was disbanded at Peshawar by being redesignated No 1 (Indian) Group on 15 August 1945; No. 225 Group disbanded at Hindustan near Bangalore by being redesignated No 2 (Indian) Group on 1 May 1946; No. 226 Group disbanded at Palam on 31 July 1946, with its units being transferred to No.2 (Indian) Group; No. 227 Group disbanded at Agra on 1 May 1946 by becoming No. 4 (Indian) Group. In May 1945 No. 228 Group had moved to Barrackpore and absorbed No. 230 Group, and then on 1 May 1946 becoming No. 3 (Indian) Group. No. 229 Group disbanded on 31 March 1947 and its responsibilities were taken over by No. 1 (Indian) Group; and No. 231 Group ceased operations on 1 August 1945, with by that time no units assigned, and disbanded on 30 September.

AHQ India was reformed on 1 April 1946, taking over the role of BAFSEA. A month before, on 1 March 1946, Air Headquarters India Communication Squadron had been established at Safdarjung Airport (RAF Willingdon). Twelve RAF squadrons (225 Group: Nos 5, 30 at Bhopal, 45 at St Thomas Mount; 227 Group: 298 Squadron at Samungli with a detachment at Chaklala; No. 228 Group RAF: 176, 658 AOP, 355 at Digri, 159 at Salbani; 229 Group: 353 and 232 at Palam; and 10 and 76 with Dakotas at Poona) remained in India after 1 April 1946, and AHQ India was placed under joint command of the Indian Government and the Air Ministry.

On 15 August 1947, the unified RIAF was separated into the Royal Indian Air Force and the Royal Pakistan Air Force, and 
AHQ India was disbanded. Air Marshal Hugh Walmsley, the final commander of RAF India and the unified RIAF, then became Deputy Supreme Commander (Air), India and Pakistan, serving as head of the AHQ, Supreme Commander's Headquarters (India and Pakistan), which had become operational from 11 August. Following the dissolution of AHQ India, two new air force headquarters for India and Pakistan were established, with two and 13 RAF officers, respectively, being assigned to each AHQ to assist with reconstituting the former RIAF into a new RIAF and Royal Pakistan Air Force. A fortnight after the partition of India, 125 RAF officers continued to serve in the subcontinent.

On 10 November 1947, Walmsley formally relinquished his appointments as Deputy Supreme Commander (Air), India and Pakistan, and as Air Officer Commanding RAF Units in India and Pakistan. He then left India for the United Kingdom, transferring his duties to his deputy, Air Commodore Richard Jordan, who closed the AHQ, Supreme Commander's Headquarters (India and Pakistan) on 17 November. On 15 December, the RIAF took command of Palam Air Station from the RAF. The former Supreme Commanders Headquarters (Air) Communication Squadron RAF then became the Air HQ Communication Squadron, Royal Indian Air Force.

Commanders

Commander, Indian Group (1919 to 1920)

Air Officer Commanding RAF, India (1920–1938)

Air Officer Commanding-in-Chief, Air Forces in India (1938–1947)

(On 15 August 1947, the unified RIAF was separated into the Royal Indian Air Force and the Royal Pakistan Air Force)

Deputy Supreme Commander (Air) India and Pakistan, and Air Officer Commanding RAF Units in India and Pakistan (1947)

See also
Royal Indian Air Force
Royal Indian Navy mutiny
History of the Indian Air Force
List of historical aircraft of the Indian Air Force
List of Royal Air Force commands

Notes

References 
British Broadcasting Corporation, BBC. People's war
British Film Institute, Secret History: Mutiny in the RAF 
John W. Cell, in Reviews of Books; Asia. White Mutiny: British Military Culture in India by Peter Stanley. The American Historical Review, Vol. 104, No. 3. (Jun., 1999), pp. 888–889.

 
David Duncan, Mutiny in the RAF - the Air Force Strikes of 1946.  .
JCC, RAF strike in India 1946.
Sir David Lee (RAF officer), Eastward: A history of the Royal Air Force in the Far East 1945–1972, HMSO 1984.

Gerry Rubin, Murder, Mutiny and the Military: British Court Martial Cases 1940–1966. Journal of Conflict and Security Law 2006 11(3):511-513.
Review of Richard Woodman's A brief history of mutiny. Journal for Maritime research. August 2005.

Royal Air Force overseas commands
Military units and formations established in 1918
Military of British India
Military units and formations disestablished in 1947
Military history of India during World War II
1946 labor disputes and strikes